Adrianna Elaine Hutto (September 16, 1999 – August 8, 2007) was a 7-year-old American girl who lived in Esto, Florida. On August 8, 2007, Adrianna's mother, Amanda E. Lewis, made a 911 call stating that she had found her daughter in the family's pool and she was not breathing. Emergency personnel rushed Adrianna to the nearby hospital Bay Medical, where she was pronounced dead about an hour after arrival. The death was initially treated as an accident until Adrianna's half-brother A.J., then 6 years old, told police that he had witnessed his mother "dunk" Adrianna in the pool as a form of corporal punishment.

Investigation
During the investigation, police discovered that Adrianna had been diagnosed with ADHD and Lewis stated that while she initially had trouble bonding with her daughter, her affection for Adrianna had grown over time. Investigators also found that neither Adrianna nor A.J. appeared to have any toys in the house, to which Lewis stated that the toys had been taken away for a week as a form of punishment and that the toys were stored in a shed. After searching the shed, investigators noted that there were no toys in the shed or any evidence to suggest that they had been there. There was a little red wagon and two inflatable toys for the pool in the yard but no other toys. Dr. Renee Fox, the emergency room physician who had handled Adrianna's medical care, informed investigators that Lewis had not shown any emotion or reaction when informed that her daughter had died, which she had found odd. Lewis submitted to and passed a lie detector test where she claimed that she had not killed her daughter. In September 2007, Lewis was arrested and charged with the first-degree murder of Adrianna. She was offered a plea bargain that would have required her to plead guilty to manslaughter and receive a ten-year sentence, which she declined in favor of going to trial.

Trial
Lewis went to trial in February 2008, where the statements by A.J. and Dr. Fox were brought up as evidence and the defense argued that A.J. was not a reliable witness, as his story had changed several times during further questioning. Other evidence brought to trial included an autopsy performed by Dr. Charles Siebert, statements from Lewis's co-workers, evidence of poor housekeeping, and the lack of toys, including Lewis's statement over the toys' whereabouts. The prosecution also pointed out multiple bruises on Adrianna's forehead that correlated with A.J.'s testimony. Four days after the case went to trial and after only two hours (including lunch) of deliberation, the jury found Lewis guilty of first-degree murder and aggravated child abuse. In March of the same year, Lewis was sentenced to life in prison without the possibility of parole.

Appeal
In 2010 Lewis filed an appeal, referring to the Merger doctrine, which she claimed "precludes the use of aggravated child abuse as the underlying felony in a felony murder charge if only a single act of abuse led to the child's death". This appeal was unsuccessful, and the conviction was affirmed.

In the media
Three television shows have highlighted this case: the Investigation Discovery show True Crime with Aphrodite Jones, an episode of 20/20, What A.J. Saw: Mother's Fate Hinged on 7-Year-Old's Testimony, and also an episode of the UK documentary series Killer Women with Piers Morgan.

References

External links
What Really Happened to Adrianna? Photos - ABC News

1999 births
2007 deaths
2007 in Florida
2007 murders in the United States
2008 in Florida
August 2007 events in the United States
Child abuse resulting in death
Deaths by person in Florida
Filicides in Florida
Incidents of violence against girls
Murder in Florida
Murdered American children